Balandi is a village in Panjwayi District, Kandahar Province, Afghanistan.

It was also the site of the 2013 Kandahar massacre

See also
Kandahar Province

References

Populated places in Kandahar Province
Panjwayi District